Metallica: This Monster Lives is a 2004 book written by Joe Berlinger and Greg Milner about how Berlinger recorded the feature-length film Metallica: Some Kind of Monster in collaboration with Metallica.
The book follows the journey both he, his film partner Bruce Sinofsky, and Metallica went through during the creation of the film. The book takes place at the time when Berlinger and Sinofsky first met with Metallica in 1999 for the 2003 Summer Sanitarium Tour. Berlinger and Sinofsky's relationship was troubled, exacerbated by Berlinger's decision to direct the unpopular sequel to Blair Witch. At the start of filming, the relationship between the band members, especially between vocalist James Hetfield and drummer Lars Ulrich, is in a similarly perilous position after bassist Jason Newsted quit the band and the long standing disputes between the remaining members threaten to escalate.

Moreover, it details the creativeness of the film. After amassing over 1,600 hours of footage, for what was originally supposed to be a short promo for the band's new album, the film's editing team had to rapidly change plans as the footage changed from the promo to a TV series and eventually to a feature film.

The book's title is a reference to a line in the band's song "Some Kind of Monster" of which the film is named after.

References

External links
Metallica Monster Lives Inside Story

2004 non-fiction books
Books about film
Metallica
Show business memoirs
St. Martin's Press books
Works by Joe Berlinger